The national emblem of Sri Lanka is used by the State of Sri Lanka and the Sri Lankan government in connection with the administration and government of the country. The current emblem has been in use since 1972 and created under the ideas and guidance of Nissanka Wijeyeratne. At the time, he was Permanent Secretary to the Ministry of Cultural Affairs and Chairman of the National Emblem and Flag Design Committee. The designer of the emblem was Venerable Mapalagama Wipulasara Maha Thera,

  and the artwork was by S. M. Seneviratne.

The emblem features a gold lion passant, holding a sword in its right fore paw (the same lion  from the flag of Sri Lanka) in the centre on a maroon background surrounded by golden petals of a Blue Lotus the national flower of the country. This is placed on top of a traditional grain vase that sprouts sheaves of rice grains that circle the border reflecting prosperity. 

The crest is the Dharmachakra, symbolizing the country's foremost place for Buddhism and just rule. Traditional Sinhalese heraldic symbols for the sun and the moon form the supporters. Sun and Moon, and Lion depicting Buddha is given less prominence than cart wheel of English Buddhism, so it is in great discordance with National Scriptures.

History

Portuguese period in Ceylon

The Portuguese had a coat of arms for their occupied territory in Sri Lanka, around 1505–1658. It has an Elephant in the foreground with palm trees around it and high mountains in the background.

Dutch period in Ceylon

It is not known when the coat of arms for the Dutch occupied territory of Sri Lanka was adopted. The coat of arms is from a manuscript dating from 1717 to 1720. The arms is very similar to the previous Portuguese one with a modified design. It show the geography of the island with mountains and palm trees, with an elephant and cinnamon bales, and two small shields. The elephant is used because it is an animal used for work on the island and it symbolises strength. In front of the elephant are three bales of cinnamon, used for it was the main export product at the time, and the elephant holds a cinnamon branch in its trunk.

British Ceylon

Before independence, Ceylon used the coat of arms of the United Kingdom as the imperial emblem and a unique shield for the colony. This contained a Sri Lankan Elephant and Coconut trees and later a stupa.

Dominion of Ceylon

When Ceylon was granted independence from Britain as a dominion in 1948, the need of a new national emblem arose. A committee was named in order to create a national emblem. According to its recommendation a national emblem was adopted in 1954. The island had been a British Crown Colony since 1802. The emblem was not strictly in the heraldic tradition, however was granted by the College of Arms in 1954. It was derived from the Royal Banner of the Kandyan Kingdom. It largely reflected the Buddhist traditions of the Sinhalese people. At its center had a disk with a gold lion passant holding a sword (here called the Ceylon lion) in its right fore paw, on a maroon background, was taken from the Royal Banner of the Kandyan Kingdom. Around it were the golden petals of a water lily and topped with the crown ensigning the roundel is called the Ceylon crown; it follows the design of the crown worn by the kings of Kandy. The crown apparently symbolised Queen Elizabeth as Head of State of Ceylon, and it disappeared from the country's arms after change of status to a republic.

Sri Lanka
The present emblem of was created in 1972 with the ideas and guidance of Nissanka Wijeyeratne. At the time, he was Permanent Secretary to the Ministry of Cultural Affairs and Chairman of the National Emblem and Flag Design Committee. The designer of the emblem was Venerable Mapalagama Wipulasara Maha Thera and Art Work by S.M Seneviratne. The emblem features a gold lion passant, holding a sword in its right fore paw (the same lion  from the flag of Sri Lanka) in the centre on a maroon background surrounded by golden petals of a Blue Lotus, the national flower of the country. This is placed on top of a traditional grain vase that sprouts sheaves of rice grains that circle the border reflecting prosperity. 

The crest is the Dharmacakra, symbolizing the country's foremost place for Buddhism and just rule. Traditional Sinhalese heraldic symbols for the sun and the moon form the supporters.

Historical coats of arms

See also
 Flag of Sri Lanka
 Sri Lanka Matha, national anthem of Sri Lanka
 Mapalagama Wipulasara Maha Thera

References

External links
 The Official Website of the Sri Lankan Government
 National Arms Of Sri Lanka
 FOTW - Sri Lanka

National symbols of Sri Lanka
Sri Lanka
Sri Lanka
Sri Lanka
Sri Lanka
Sri Lanka
Sri Lanka
Sri Lanka